Taedonggang station is a railway station located in P'yŏngyang, North Korea. It is located on the south bank of the Taedong River at the junction of the P'yŏngbu and P'yŏngdŏk lines.

The Taedonggang Hotel is nearby, and the station is served by Line 3 of the P'yŏngyang tram system.

History
The station was opened by the Chosen Government Railway on 1 September 1911, as part of the P'yŏngyang Colliery Line. During the Korean War, army trains of the South Korean Army operated between Taedonggang and Imjin stations between November and December 1950.

References

Railway stations in North Korea